Irrsee is a lake in the Salzkammergut, Austria, located at . It is a popular tourist destination, also thanks to the warmest water temperature of all lakes in Salzkammergut. It is drained by the Zeller Ache towards the Mondsee.

Lakes of Upper Austria